The Capra (also: Pârâul Jidanului) is a left tributary of the river Bicaz in Romania. It flows into the Bicaz in Bicazu Ardelean.

References

Rivers of Romania
Rivers of Neamț County